Marques Lamont Douglas (born March 5, 1977, in Greensboro, North Carolina) is a former American football defensive tackle and defensive end who played for five teams in the National Football League during an 11-year career. He was signed by the Baltimore Ravens as an undrafted free agent in 1999. He played college football at Howard.

Douglas played for the Ravens, New Orleans Saints, San Francisco 49ers, New York Jets and the Tennessee Titans.  He also played for Rhein Fire, an NFL Europe team, and was on the roster of the Miami Dolphins and Tampa Bay Buccaneers.

Professional career

Early career
He was signed as an undrafted free agent by the Baltimore Ravens in 1999, though he didn't see any playing time. He then played for the New Orleans Saints in 2000, active for one game. He then returned to the Ravens from 2001 through 2004. During his time with the Ravens, he started 32 games, becoming a full-time starter for the 2003 and 2004 seasons, and registered a total of 147 tackles, 12 sacks, and 3 forced fumbles.

San Francisco 49ers
He was then signed as an unrestricted free agent by the San Francisco 49ers in 2005. He was brought in by Mike Nolan to help the 49ers adjust into the 3-4 defensive scheme. Douglas led all defensive linemen in tackles behind the line of scrimmage his last year.

Tampa Bay Buccaneers
On March 13, 2008, the Tampa Bay Buccaneers signed Douglas to a four-year contract.

Third stint with Ravens
On August 27, 2008, the Tampa Bay Buccaneers traded Douglas to the Baltimore Ravens for an undisclosed draft pick. He was released on February 27, 2009.

New York Jets
An unrestricted free agent after the 2008 season, Douglas signed with the New York Jets on March 13, 2009.  Douglas' contract expired after the 2009 season and was not re-signed by the Jets.

Miami Dolphins
Douglas signed with the Miami Dolphins on July 23, 2010. He was cut on September 5, 2010.

Tennessee Titans
Douglas signed with the Tennessee Titans on November 9, 2010.  He played in six regular season games for the Titans in 2010, his final season in the NFL.

References

External links
 Tennessee Titans bio

1977 births
Living people
Players of American football from Greensboro, North Carolina
African-American players of American football
American football defensive ends
American football defensive tackles
Howard Bison football players
Baltimore Ravens players
New Orleans Saints players
Rhein Fire players
San Francisco 49ers players
New York Jets players
Miami Dolphins players
21st-century African-American sportspeople
20th-century African-American sportspeople
Tennessee Titans players
Ed Block Courage Award recipients